Cotar ( Čotar) is a South Slavic language surname. Notable people with the surname include:

Anamarija Čotar, a member of Slovenian  musical group Perpetuum Jazzile
, French American football player
 Joana Cotar (born 1973), German politician
 Martin Cotar (born 1977), Croatian cyclist